Villa Massimo, short for Deutsche Akademie Rom Villa Massimo, is a German cultural institution in Rome, established in 1910 and located in the Villa Massimo.

The fellowship of the German Academy in Rome is one of the most important awards granted to distinguished artists for study abroad. The award offers residencies of one year at Villa Massimo in Rome as well as three months at Casa Baldi in Olevano Romano to artists who have excelled in Germany and abroad, including architects, composers, writers and artists.

The institution's founder was the patron and entrepreneur Eduard Arnhold, who in 1910 acquired the beautiful property of 36,000 m2, previously the suburban villa of the aristocratic Massimo family. Arnhold commissioned the main building, a large villa appropriate for official events, and ten modern studios with adjacent private residential spaces. He later donated the villa and its luxurious furnishings to the Prussian state. Today, Villa Massimo is managed by the German Federal Ministry of Cultural Affairs and Media. From 2002 to June 2019 Joachim Blüher was the director of the Academy. He was succeeded by Julia Draganović.

Selected recipients

Artists 
 1931 Hermann Blumenthal
 1932 Felix Nussbaum, Arno Breker
 1933 Carlo Mense
 1935 Alfred Knispel
 1957 Fritz Koenig
 1976 Anselm Kiefer
 1979/1980 Rolf-Gunter Dienst
 1980/1981 Hans Peter Reuter
 1986/1987 Annegret Soltau, Giso Westing, Nanne Meyer, Sigrun Jakubaschke 
 1989 Manfred Stumpf, Anton Kokl
 1991/1992 Eberhard Bosslet, Stephan Kern, Anton Kokl, Thomas Lehnerer, Michael Witlatschil
 1997/1998 Matthias Leupold, Rolf Bier, Heike Kern
 2003 Roland Boden, Thomas Demand, Leni Hoffmann, Matthias Hoch, Volkhard Kempter, Rainer Splitt, Silke Schatz
 2004 Martin Schmidt, Adam Page, Frank Mädler, Markus Löffler, Andree Korpys, Eva Hertzsch, Christoph Girardet
 2005 Gabriele Basch, Manuel Franke, Sandra Hastenteufel, Wolfgang Kaiser, Veronika Kellndorfer 
 2006 Christoph Brech, Sandra Hastenteufel, Parastou Forouhar, Astrid Nippoldt
 2007 Aurelia Mihai, Stefan Mauck, Carsten Nicolai, Matthias Weischer
 2008 Felix Schramm, Elke Zauner, David Zink Yi
 2009 Fernando Bryce, Henriette Grahnert, Jochen Lempert
 2010 Christian Jankowski, Heidi Specker, Christian Jankowski, Ulrike Kuschel
 2011 Via Lewandowsky, Julia Schmidt, Maria Sewcz
 2012 Jeanne Faust, Eva Leitolf, Nicole Wermers, Phillipp Lachenmann
 2013 David Schnell, Isa Melsheimer, Clemens von Wedemeyer
 2014 Hans-Christian Schink, Nasan Tur, Annika Larsson, Eli Cortinas
 2015 Marieta Chirulescu, Maix Mayer, Karin Sander
 2016/2017 Nezaket Ekici, Adnan Softic, Göran Gnaudschun
 2017/2018 Jörg Herold, Thomas Baldischwyler, Bettina Allamoda, Christoph Keller
 2018/2019 Sonja Alhäuser, Erik Göngrich, Wolfgang Ellenrieder, Julian Rosefeldt.
 2019/2020 Tatjana Doll
 2021/2022 David Czupryn

Architects 
 1932 Carl Ludwig Franck
 1933 Fritz Sonntag
 1983/84 Peter Riemann
 1986 Karl-Heinz Petzinka
 1995 Claudia Meixner 
 2003 Imke Woelk
 2004 Heike Schuppelius
 2005 Heike Böttcher, Jakob Timpe
 2006 Bernd Bess
 2007 Antje Freiesleben, Rudolf Finsterwalder, Wieka Muthesius
 2008 Beate Kirsch, 
 2009 Sebastian Reinhardt, Daniel Widrig
 2010 Jan Liesegang, Norbert Sachs 
 2011 Andrea Hartmann, Matthias Graf von Ballestrem
 2012 Antje Buchholz, Birgit Elisabeth Frank, Kai Nikolaus Grüne, Jörn Köppler
 2013 Pia Meier Schriever, Eike Roswag, Anna Viader Soler, Verena von Beckerath 
 2014 Jan Edler, Thilo Folkerts 
 2015 Michael Hirschbichler, Jorg Sieweke 
 2016/2017 Anna Kubelik
 2017/2018 Benedict Esche
 2018/2019 Lars Krückeberg

Composers 
 1957 and 1964 Bernd Alois Zimmermann
 1958 Wilhelm Killmayer, Heino Schubert
 1959 Hans Otte
 1959 and 1962–63 Giselher Klebe
 1960 Jürg Baur, Alfred Koerppen
 1963/1964 Hans Zender, Aribert Reimann 
 1964/1965 Friedrich Voss
 1965/1966 Heinz Werner Zimmermann, Wilhelm Killmayer, Heide Werner
 1966/1967 and 1977 Erhard Grosskopf
 1967/1968 Friedhelm Döhl
 1968 Jürg Baur
 1972/1973 Hans-Joachim Hespos
 1977 Manfred Trojahn
 1978/1979 Ulrich Leyendecker, Wolfgang von Schweinitz
 1979/1980 Wolfgang Rihm, Peter Michael Hamel
 1980 and 1982 Detlev Müller-Siemens
 1981/1982 and 1983 Hans-Jürgen von Bose
 1981/1982 and 1984 Wilfried Hiller
 1982/1983 Renate Birnstein
 1983 Peter Kiesewetter
 1983/1984 Reinhard Febel, Gerhard Müller-Hornbach
 1984/1985 Hans-Christian von Dadelsen, York Höller, Peter Kiesewetter
 1985/1986 Harald Weiss
 1986/1987 Michael Denhoff, Walter Zimmermann
 1987/1988 Max Beckschäfer, Susanne Erding-Swiridoff
 1990/1991 Wilfried Maria Danner, Claus Kühnl
 1992/1993 Detlev Glanert, Jan Müller-Wieland
 1993 Adriana Hölszky
 1994 Steffen Schleiermacher
 1995 Helmut Oehring
 1995/1996 André Werner, Fredrik Zeller
 1996/1997 Moritz Eggert, Detlef Heusinger
 1997/1998 Carola Bauckholt, Markus Schmitt
 1998/1999 Claus-Steffen Mahnkopf, Caspar Johannes Walter
 2003 Johannes Kalitzke
 2004 Carsten Hennig, Jamilia Jazylbekova
 2005 Sebastian Claren, Sergej Newski, Rudi Spring 
 2006 Oliver Schneller, Maxim Seloujanov
 2007 Dieter Dolezel, Sylke Zimpel
 2008 Arnulf Herrmann, Stephan Winkler 
 2009 Márton Illés, Charlotte Seither
 2010 Philipp Maintz, Anno Schreier
 2011 Sven-Ingo Koch, Marc Sabat
 2012 Stefan Bartling, Hauke Berheide
 2013 Birke J. Bertelsmeier, Stefan Johannes Hanke
 2014 Hanna Eimermacher, Vito Žuraj
 2016/2017 Torsten Herrmann, Lisa Streich
 2017/2018 Gordon Kampe, Jay Schwartz
 2018/2019 Anna Korsun, Samy Moussa
 2019/2020 Torsten Rasch, Ying Wang
 2020/2021 Unsuk Chin
 2021/2022 Stefan Goldmann, Hanna Hartman, Hans Lüdemann

Writers 
 1959 Hans Magnus Enzensberger
 1961 Joseph Reding
 1962 Uwe Johnson
 1972/1973 Rolf Dieter Brinkmann, Nicolas Born, Heike Doutiné, Alf Poss
 1981/1982 Hugo Dittberner, Roland Lang
 1993 Hanns-Josef Ortheil, Johanna Walser
 1991/1992 Herta Müller
 2003 Thomas Kunst
 2004 Marion Poschmann, Dieter M. Gräf
 2005 Julia Franck, Feridun Zaimoğlu
 2006 Terézia Mora, Andreas Maier, Gregor Sander
 2007 Ulf Stolterfoht, Ingo Schulze
 2008 Navid Kermani, Thorsten Becker
 2009 Rabea Edel, Silke Scheuermann
 2010 Marcel Beyer, Kathrin Schmidt
 2011 Jan Wagner, Lutz Seiler
 2012 Katja Lange-Müller,
 2013 María Cecilia Barbetta, Sibylle Lewitscharoff
 2014 Oswald Egger, Martin Mosebach
 2015 Eva Menasse
 2016/2017 Heike Geißler, Nina Jäckle, Hartmut Lange
 2017/2018 Iris Hanika, Uljana Wolf
 2018/2019 Nico Bleutge, Thomas von Steinaecker
 2019/2020 Peter Wawerzinek

Practical scholarship 
 2008 Christine Birkle, Friedrich Forssman, Valentina Simeonova, Till Verclas, Josef Wagner
 2009 Martin Claßen, Armin Holz, Otto Sander, Helene Scharge, Sasha Waltz, Carolin Widmann
 2010 Konstantin Grcic, Wolfram Gabler, Marisol Montalvo, Stephan Müller, Anna Viebrock, Tanja Wesse, Werner J. Wolff
 2011 Peter Zizka, Soo-Jin Yim Heil, Michael Riessler, Jan Kollwitz, Lothar Baumgarten
 2012 Till Brönner, Jacqueline Huste, Jim Rakete, Wolfgang Sattler, Markus Schroer, Phillip Stollmann
 2013 Christian Brückner, Dieter Froelich, Barbara Klemm, Eike König, Jaroslav Poncar
 2014 Stefan Sagmeister, Jan-Ole Gerster, Emmanuel Heringer, Paul Lovens, Saam Schlamminger
 2015 Andreas Uebele, Manos Tsangaris, Tobias Müller, Bernd Grimm, Andreas Bode, Bettina Blümner
 2016/2017 Anna Depenbusch, Corinna Oschmann, Iain Dilthey, Joachim Sauter, Philip Gröning, Susanne Schimk
 2017/2018 Werner Aisslinger, Mojca Erdmann, David Schnell
 2018/2019 Pan Daijing, Marie-Elisabeth Hecker, Martin Helmchen, Rike Schmid, Oliver Siegelin, Patrick Thomas

See also 
 American Academy in Rome
 British School at Rome
 Romanian Academy in Rome
 List of European art awards

References

 Recipients since 1913 
 History of Villa Massimo

External links
 

Foreign academies in Rome
1910 establishments in Italy
Prussian cultural sites
Awards established in 1910
M
Rome Q. V Nomentano
Visual arts awards